Elizabeth Eliot (or similar)  may refer to:

People 
Elizabeth Eliot (1616–?), daughter of Sir John Eliot and first wife of Nathaniel Fiennes
Elizabeth Elliot (baptized 1645), daughter of Daniel Gookin and second wife of Edmund Quincy
Elizabeth Eliot (died 1771), daughter of Richard Eliot and first wife of Charles Cocks, 1st Baron Somers
Elizabeth Mary Eliot (1785–1872), daughter of Francis Perceval Eliot
Lady Elizabeth Harriet Cornwallis Eliot (1833–1835), daughter of Edward Eliot, 3rd Earl of St Germans
Hon Elizabeth Eliot of Port Eliot, Cornwall, subject of an 1838 statue Samuel Joseph
Elisabeth Elliot (1926–2015), Christian author and speaker
Elizabeth Elliott (romance author)
Elizabeth Elliott (paediatrician)

Fiction 
Elizabeth Elliot, a character in Jane Austen's 1816 work Persuasion